The Roman van Ferguut is a 13th-century Arthurian romance written in what is now called Middle Dutch (historically classified as [Low] German). The first part of the Roman was translated fairly accurately from the Scottish French language work known as the Roman de Fergus, but the second part, possibly the work of another author, was much more loosely derived. The Roman van Ferguut today has wide fame as a Dutch classic, certainly more fame than the Roman de Fergus possesses in either Scotland or France. In 2000, it was translated into English by the American scholar David F Johnson.

See also
Fergus of Galloway
Roman de Fergus

References

External links
Roman de Fergus and the Roman van Ferguut (in Dutch)

13th-century books
Arthurian literature in Dutch
Middle Dutch literature
Medieval literature